Rampion bellflower is a common name for several plants and may refer to:

 Campanula rapunculoides
 Campanula rapunculus